Casper College is a public community college in Casper, Wyoming. It is one of the largest and most comprehensive community colleges in the region. Established in 1945 as Wyoming's first junior college and initially located on the third floor of Natrona County High School, Casper College moved to its current site 10 years later. Currently the campus consists of 28 buildings on more than 200 acres. The grounds are distinctive, with terraces that surround the modern buildings. It currently enrolls 4,023 students. There are approximately 250 faculty. The Tate Geological Museum is located on the south end of the campus.

Academics

Casper College offers more than 50 academic majors and 30 technical and career field options. The academic side of the college is organized into five different Schools: Business and Industry, Fine Arts and Humanities, Health Science, Science, Social and Behavioral Science.

Athletics
Casper College participates in the National Junior College Athletic Association in the following sports.
Men's Basketball
Women's Basketball 
Rodeo
Volleyball
Men's Soccer (added in 2020)
Women's Soccer (added in 2020)

Swede Erickson Thunderbird Gym is the home venue for Casper College men's basketball, women's basketball and volleyball.

2012 on-campus murder
On Friday November 30, 2012, Christopher Krumm, the 25 year-old son of Casper College faculty member James Krumm, went to the residence of his father and Heidi Arnold, who also taught at the college. Christopher stabbed Heidi several times, most of which took place outside. He then went to the college to find James. Police received the first phone call just after 9 a.m., and received a second call just minutes later. Heidi was stabbed multiple times. Authorities found signs of defensive wounds on her body. She was found barefoot and still dressed in pajamas in the street outside their home.

Christopher arrived at the college with two knives and a compound bow hidden under a blanket. He walked into his father's classroom and shot him in the head with the bow at point blank range. Jim rose up and attacked his son, allowing his students to escape.

Not everything is known about their final struggle, but three fellow faculty members tried to intervene. Christopher eventually stabbed himself, leading to his death. Paramedics arrived to find Jim already dead; although Christopher still showed signs of life, they were unable to save him. Evidence indicated that Christopher was distressed because he had Asperger's Syndrome, which he blamed his father for giving him, and that he wanted to ensure his father would not give the disorder to anyone else.

Notable alumni
Wayne Hunter (Entomologist)
Chris LeDoux, Country singer and rodeo cowboy
Dick Cheney, Former Vice President of the United States
Earle Higgins Former Professional Basketball Player Indiana Pacers
Bob Lackey Former Professional Basketball Player New York Nets
Flynn Robinson Former Professional Basketball Player Cincinnati Royals, Chicago Bulls, Milwaukee Bucks, Los Angeles Lakers, Baltimore Bullets
Marlan Scully American physicist best known for his work in theoretical quantum optics.

References

External links
Official website

 
Buildings and structures in Casper, Wyoming
Education in Natrona County, Wyoming
Educational institutions established in 1945
1945 establishments in Wyoming
Community colleges in Wyoming
Tourist attractions in Casper, Wyoming
NJCAA athletics